Blorenge Buttress is a prominent, orange-colored pillar of sandstone,  west of the summit of Flagship Mountain at the west end of the Viking Hills, Convoy Range, Victoria Land. The pillar is flanked to the west by steep blue ice and a huge windscoop from Flight Deck Neve and rises sheer from a large ice-free area to the north. The feature was geologically mapped by the Victoria University of Wellington Antarctic Expedition, 1976–77, led by Christopher J. Burgess who named it after The Blorenge, a mountain in Wales, Great Britain.

References 

Rock formations of the Ross Dependency
Scott Coast